House of Anansi Press is a Canadian publishing company, founded in 1967 by writers Dennis Lee and Dave Godfrey. The company specializes in finding and developing new Canadian writers of literary fiction, poetry, and non-fiction.

History
Anansi started as a small press with only one full-time employee, writer George Fetherling. It quickly gained attention for publishing significant authors such as Margaret Atwood, Matt Cohen, Michael Ondaatje, Marian Engel, Erín Moure, Paulette Jiles, George Grant and Northrop Frye. The company also published many translations of French language works by authors such as Roch Carrier, Anne Hébert, Lise Bissonnette and Marie-Claire Blais.

Anansi publishes the transcripts for many of the Massey Lectures.

House of Anansi Press was purchased in 1989 by General Publishing, parent of Stoddart Publishing.  In June 2002 it was acquired by Scott Griffin, founder of the Griffin Poetry Prize.

Select bibliography
Survival: A Thematic Guide to Canadian Literature, Margaret Atwood (1972)

References

External links
 Official Site
 List of references
 Archives of the House of Anansi Press (House of Anasi Press fonds, R11750) are held at Library and Archives Canada

Book publishing companies of Canada
Publishing companies established in 1967
1967 establishments in Ontario